Rashtra is the word for "nation" in several Indo-Aryan languages, derived from a Sanskrit root. Rashtriya is the adjectival form for Rashtra.

Rashtra
Gopa Rashtra
Hindu Rashtra
Rashtra Sevika Samiti
Pakistaner Rashtra Bhasha: Bangla Na Urdu?

Rashtriya
Rastriya Sabha
Rashtriya Swayamsevak Sangh
Rashtriya Ispat Nigam
Muslim Rashtriya Manch

See also